The Gay Street is an area in Rome, Italy designated as a gay- and lesbian-friendly neighborhood. A 300-metre shopping and bar area in the center of the city on Via San Giovanni in Laterano, a street leading to the east flank of the Colosseum, it was formally designated in 2007.
The opening ceremonies, led by the Italian LGBT organization Arcigay, were attended by celebrities and national and municipal politicians.

See also

Gay village

References 
 Gay street opens in Rome, USA Today
  Bacio gay, due giovani fermati al Colosseo — Corriere della Sera
  L'inaugurazione della Gay Street — Arcigay Roma

2007 establishments in Italy
LGBT culture in Italy
Gay villages in Italy
Culture in Rome
Tourist attractions in Rome
Shopping districts and streets in Rome